Julien Miquel AIWS is a French winemaker, founder of 2015 Best New Wine Blog: Social Vignerons, and a wine personality on the internet and social media.

Biography
Originally from France, Julien Miquel studied biology at University of Toulouse before graduating in 2004 from the French winemaking college: Faculté d’Oenologie de Bordeaux.

Miquel knew an international flying winemaker career from 2004 to 2009 bringing him to make wine at some of the most famous wine estates in the world including: Château Margaux in Bordeaux region, Château St Jean in Sonoma County, Caiarossa in Tuscany and Campo Eliseo in Spain with famous winemaker Michel Rolland.

For 6 years he was the Team Leader for Wine-Searcher,

In 2015, the website founded by Julien Miquel was awarded 2015 Best New Wine Blog by the Wine Bloggers Conference.

That same year, Miquel was ranked among the Top 10 most influential wine people in the world on internet and social media according to the website Klout which has often been criticized for its ranking system.

References

French winemakers